Eunomus (reigned from c. 805 to c. 775 BC) was king of Sparta and a member of the Eurypontid dynasty. He was succeeded by king Charilaus.

References 

8th-century BC rulers
8th-century BC Spartans
Eurypontid kings of Sparta